Lynemouth Colliery was a coal mine in Lynemouth, Northumberland, England. It was in operation between 1927 and 1994. According to Historic England, "it was one of Britain's largest collieries until it was closed due to an underground fire". The colliery was demolished in 2005.

Its number 1 pit was the downcast, and its number 2 was the upcast.

In 1960, the mine employed 1,734 people (1,390 above ground, 344 below).

References 

Energy infrastructure completed in 1927
1927 establishments in England
1994 disestablishments in England
Buildings and structures in Northumberland
Coal mines in England
Former coal mines